Don't Forget is a 2008 album by Demi Lovato.

Don't Forget may also refer to:

Songs
 "Don't Forget" (Demi Lovato song), 2008
 "Don't Forget" (Sky Ferreira song), 2022
 "Remember Me" (T.I. song), originally titled "Don't Forget", 2009
 "Don't Forget", by Blxst, 2021
 "Don't Forget", by Jeff Tweedy from Warm, 2018
 "Don't Forget", by Lil Yachty from Lil Boat 3, 2020
 "Don't Forget", by Madeline Kenney from Night Night at the First Landing, 2017
 "Don't Forget", by Martha Wainwright from Martha Wainwright, 2005
 "Don't Forget", by Nat King Cole from Those Lazy-Hazy-Crazy Days of Summer, 1963
 "Don't Forget", by Rod Wave from SoulFly, 2021
 "Don't Forget", by Toby Fox from Deltarune Chapter 1 OST, 2018

See also